Lamar is a town in Darlington County, South Carolina, United States. The population was 989 at the 2010 census. It is part of the Florence, SC Metropolitan Statistical Area.

History
In March of 2019, the Mayor of Lamar, Darnell Byrd McPherson, called police to her home to investigate a hate crime.  She said her car and her husband's car had been sprayed with a yellow substance by some vandals.  However, police determined that the substance was just pollen.

Geography
Lamar is located in southwestern Darlington County at  (34.170388, -80.062526). U.S. Route 401 passes through the town, leading northeast  to Darlington, the county seat, and southwest  to Sumter.

Demographics

As of the census of 2000, there were 1,015 people, 417 households, and 286 families residing in the town. The population density was 874.6 people per square mile (337.8/km2). There were 467 housing units at an average density of 402.4 per square mile (155.4/km2). The racial makeup of the town was 53.50% White, 45.71% African American, 0.10% Native American, 0.10% Asian, and 0.59% from two or more races. Hispanic or Latino of any race were 0.89% of the population.

There were 417 households, out of which 24.2% had children under the age of 18 living with them, 46.0% were married couples living together, 18.2% had a female householder with no husband present, and 31.2% were non-families. 29.3% of all households were made up of individuals, and 15.3% had someone living alone who was 65 years of age or older. The average household size was 2.43 and the average family size was 3.01.

In the town, the population was spread out, with 24.5% under the age of 18, 6.9% from 18 to 24, 25.7% from 25 to 44, 25.8% from 45 to 64, and 17.0% who were 65 years of age or older. The median age was 41 years. For every 100 females, there were 91.1 males. For every 100 females age 18 and over, there were 81.9 males.

The median income for a household in the town was $28,571, and the median income for a family was $35,789. Males had a median income of $29,000 versus $26,250 for females. The per capita income for the town was $15,473. About 22.4% of families and 24.4% of the population were below the poverty line, including 35.7% of those under age 18 and 17.7% of those age 65 or over.

Education
Lamar has a public library, a branch of the Darlington County Library System. Lamar is also home to Lamar High School.

Notable people
 John Abraham, former NFL outside linebacker
 David Beasley, Executive Director of World Food Program and 113th governor of South Carolina from 1995 to 1999
 John Boston (ca. 1832–after 1880) was a former slave who was a representative for the South Carolina House of Representatives during the Reconstruction era. He was a minister who established the Lamar Colored Methodist Church in 1865. He was born and lived in Lisbon Township, now called Lamar.
 Cobie Durant, NFL cornerback
 B. J. Goodson, NFL player
 Michael Hamlin, former NFL safety
 Levon Kirkland, former NFL linebacker
 Marshall McFadden, former NFL player

References

External links
 City-Data.com

Towns in Darlington County, South Carolina
Towns in South Carolina
Florence, South Carolina metropolitan area